Alpha Vulpeculae (α Vulpeculae, abbreviated Alpha Vul, α Vul), officially named Anser , is the brightest star in the constellation of Vulpecula. It is approximately 291 light-years from Earth. It forms a wide optical binary with 8 Vulpeculae.

Alpha Vulpeculae is a red giant of spectral class M1 and has an apparent magnitude of +4.4. It has been analyzed as a member of the Arcturus stream, a group of stars with high proper motion and metal-poor properties thought to be the remnants of a small galaxy consumed by the Milky Way.

Nomenclature 

α Vulpeculae (Latinised to Alpha Vulpeculae) is the system's Bayer designation.

It bore the traditional name Anser, derived from when the constellation had the name Vulpecula cum Ansere 'the little fox with the goose'. In 2016, the IAU organized a Working Group on Star Names (WGSN) to catalog and standardize proper names for stars. The WGSN approved the name Anser for this star on 30 June 2017 and it is now so included in the List of IAU-approved Star Names.

Description 

α Vulpeculae has evolved away from the main sequence after exhausting its core hydrogen and is now a red giant, probably on the red giant branch. It is about 11.3 billion years since it first formed.

α Vulpeculae has been suspected to be variable in brightness by about a tenth of a magnitude, but this has never been confirmed.

References

Arcturus moving group
Vulpeculae, 06
Vulpecula
Vulpeculae, Alpha
M-type giants
Anser
095771
Durchmusterung objects
7405
183439
Suspected variables
TIC objects